Steffenville is an unincorporated community in southwestern Lewis County, Missouri, United States. It is located on Missouri Supplemental Route D, approximately 22 miles southwest of Canton. The community is part of the Quincy, IL–MO Micropolitan Statistical Area.

A post office called Steffenville was established in 1872, and remained in operation until 1988. Steffenville was named for Henry Steffens, a pioneer settler. The Steffens family was the original owner of the town site.

References

Unincorporated communities in Lewis County, Missouri
Quincy, Illinois micropolitan area
Unincorporated communities in Missouri